Orlando Rodríguez may refer to:

Orlando Rodríguez (footballer) (born 1984), Panamanian footballer
Orlando "Q" Rodriguez (born 1947), American percussionist

See also
Orlando Rodrigues (born 1969), Portuguese cyclist
Orlando Rodrigues (sailor) (1932–2000), Portuguese sailor